Security Risk is a 1954 American action film directed by Harold D. Schuster and written by Jo Pagano and John Rich. The film stars John Ireland, Dorothy Malone, Keith Larsen, Dolores Donlon, John Craven and Susan Cummings. The film was released on August 8, 1954, by Allied Artists Pictures.

Plot

Cast          
John Ireland as Ralph Payne
Dorothy Malone as Donna Weeks
Keith Larsen as Ted Noland
Dolores Donlon as Peggy Weeks
John Craven as Dr. Lanson
Susan Cummings as Joan Cochran 
Joe Bassett as Malone
Burt Wenland as Burke
Steven Clark as Johnny
Murray Alper as Mike
Harold J. Kennedy as Sheriff Bowman

References

External links
 

1950s action films
1954 films
Allied Artists films
American action films
American skiing films
1950s English-language films
Films directed by Harold D. Schuster
Cold War spy films
American black-and-white films
1950s American films